KKPR-FM (98.9 FM) is a radio station broadcasting a classic hits format. Licensed to Kearney, Nebraska, United States, the station serves the Grand Island-Kearney area. The station is currently owned by Flood Communications Tri-Cities, L.L.C.

The station launched in November 1962 as KRNY-FM.

On April 1, 2022, KKPR-FM rebranded as "98.9 The Vibe".

Previous logo

References

External links

KPR-FM
Classic hits radio stations in the United States